Sara Bergen (born 6 December 1988) is a Canadian former professional racing cyclist, who rode professionally for UCI Women's Continental Team , between 2017 and 2020.

Career
She rode in the women's road race at the 2016 UCI Road World Championships, riding lead out to sprinters Joëlle Numainville and Leah Kirchmann to a record two top 15 finishes, finishing in 91st place.

Personal life
Outside of cycling, Bergen holds a Bachelor of Technology degree in Architectural Science and a diploma in Architectural and Building Engineering Technology from British Columbia Institute of Technology.

References

External links
 

1988 births
Living people
Canadian female cyclists
Sportspeople from Vancouver